Halogen CD is the thirteenth studio album by power electronics band Whitehouse, released in April 1994 through their Susan Lawly label. The album's cover was made by artist Trevor Brown, who previously collaborated with the band on their 1991 album Twice Is Not Enough.

Track listing

Personnel
William Bennett - vocals, synthesizers, production
Peter Sotos - lyrics
Steve Albini - recording, production
Trevor Brown - artwork
Akiko Hada - photography
Denis Blackham - mastering

References

1994 albums
Whitehouse (band) albums
Albums produced by Steve Albini